Rudbar Rural District is a rural district (dehestan) in the Central District of Rudbar-e Jonubi County, Kerman Province, Iran. At the 2006 census, its population was 22,096, in 4,476 families. The rural district has 53 villages.

References 

Rural Districts of Kerman Province
Rudbar-e Jonubi County